Enzo Frisoni (born 10 March 1947) is a former Sammarinese cyclist. He competed in the individual road race at the 1968 Summer Olympics.

References

External links
 

1947 births
Living people
Sammarinese male cyclists
Italian male cyclists
Italian people of Sammarinese descent
Olympic cyclists of San Marino
Cyclists at the 1968 Summer Olympics
Sportspeople from Rimini
Cyclists from Emilia-Romagna